Construction grammar (often abbreviated CxG) is a family of theories within the field of cognitive linguistics which posit that constructions, or learned pairings of linguistic patterns with meanings, are the fundamental building blocks of human language. Constructions include words (aardvark, avocado), morphemes (anti-, -ing), fixed expressions and idioms (by and large, jog X's memory), and abstract grammatical rules such as the passive voice (The cat was hit by a car) or the ditransitive (Mary gave Alex the ball). Any linguistic pattern is considered to be a construction as long as some aspect of its form or its meaning cannot be predicted from its component parts, or from other constructions that are recognized to exist. In construction grammar, every utterance is understood to be a combination of multiple different constructions, which together specify its precise meaning and form.

Advocates of construction grammar argue that language and culture are not designed by people, but are 'emergent' or automatically constructed in a process which is comparable to natural selection in species or the formation of natural constructions such as nests made by social insects. Constructions correspond to replicators or memes in memetics and other cultural replicator theories. It is argued that construction grammar is not an original model of cultural evolution, but for essential part the same as memetics.  Construction grammar is associated with concepts from cognitive linguistics that aim to show in various ways how human rational and creative behaviour is automatic and not planned.

History 
Construction grammar was first developed in the 1980s by linguists such as Charles Fillmore, Paul Kay, and George Lakoff, in order to analyze idioms and fixed expressions. Lakoff's 1977 paper "Linguistic Gestalts" put forward an early version of CxG, arguing that the meaning of an expression was not simply a function of the meanings of its parts. Instead, he suggested, constructions themselves must have meanings.

Another early study was "There-Constructions," which appeared as Case Study 3 in George Lakoff's Women, Fire, and Dangerous Things. It argued that the meaning of the whole was not a function of the meanings of the parts, that odd grammatical properties of Deictic There-constructions followed from the pragmatic meaning of the construction, and that variations on the central construction could be seen as simple extensions using form-meaning pairs of the central construction.

Fillmore et al.'s (1988) paper on the English let alone construction was a second classic. These two papers propelled cognitive linguists into the study of CxG. Since the late 1990s there has been a shift towards a general preference for the usage-based model. The shift towards the usage-based approach in construction grammar has inspired the development of several corpus-based methodologies of constructional analysis (for example, collostructional analysis).

Concepts

One of the most distinctive features of CxG is its use of multi-word expressions and phrasal patterns as the building blocks of syntactic analysis. One example is the Correlative Conditional construction, found in the proverbial expression The bigger they come, the harder they fall. Construction grammarians point out that this is not merely a fixed phrase; the Correlative Conditional is a general pattern (The Xer, the Yer) with "slots" that can be filled by almost any comparative phrase (e.g. The more you think about it, the less you understand). Advocates of CxG argue these kinds of idiosyncratic patterns are more common than is often recognized, and that they are best understood as multi-word, partially filled constructions.

Construction grammar rejects the idea that there is a sharp dichotomy between lexical items, which are arbitrary and specific, and grammatical rules, which are completely general. Instead, CxG posits that there are linguistic patterns at every level of generality and specificity: from individual words, to partially filled constructions (e.g. drive X crazy), to fully abstract rules (e.g. subject–auxiliary inversion). All of these patterns are recognized as constructions.

In contrast to theories that posit an innate universal grammar for all languages, construction grammar holds that speakers learn constructions inductively as they are exposed to them, using general cognitive processes. It is argued that children pay close attention to each utterance they hear, and gradually make generalizations based on the utterances they have heard. Because constructions are learned, they are expected to vary considerably across different languages.

Grammatical construction 
In construction grammar, as in general semiotics, the grammatical construction is a pairing of form and content. The formal aspect of a construction is typically described as a syntactic template, but the form covers more than just syntax, as it also involves phonological aspects, such as prosody and intonation. The content covers semantic as well as pragmatic meaning.

The semantic meaning of a grammatical construction is made up of conceptual structures postulated in cognitive semantics: image-schemas, frames, conceptual metaphors, conceptual metonymies, prototypes of various kinds, mental spaces, and bindings across these (called "blends"). Pragmatics just becomes the cognitive semantics of communication—the modern version of the old Ross-Lakoff performative hypothesis from the 1960s.

The form and content are symbolically linked in the sense advocated by Langacker.

Thus a construction is treated like a sign in which all structural aspects are integrated parts and not distributed over different modules as they are in the componential model. Consequentially, not only constructions that are lexically fixed, like many idioms, but also more abstract ones like argument structure schemata, are pairings of form and conventionalized meaning. For instance, the ditransitive schema [S V IO DO] is said to express semantic content X CAUSES Y TO RECEIVE Z, just like kill means X CAUSES Y TO DIE.

In construction grammar, a grammatical construction, regardless of its formal or semantic complexity and make up, is a pairing of form and meaning. Thus words and word classes may be regarded as instances of constructions. Indeed, construction grammarians argue that all pairings of form and meaning are constructions, including phrase structures, idioms, words and even morphemes.

Syntax–lexicon continuum 
Unlike the componential model, construction grammar denies any strict distinction between the two and proposes a syntax–lexicon continuum. The argument goes that words and complex constructions are both pairs of form and meaning and differ only in internal symbolic complexity. Instead of being discrete modules and thus subject to very different processes they form the extremes of a continuum (from regular to idiosyncratic): syntax > subcategorization frame > idiom > morphology >  syntactic category > word/lexicon (these are the traditional terms; construction grammars use a different terminology).

Grammar as an inventory of constructions 
In construction grammar, the grammar of a language is made up of taxonomic networks of families of constructions, which are based on the same principles as those of the conceptual categories known from cognitive linguistics, such as inheritance, prototypicality, extensions, and multiple parenting.

Four different models are proposed in relation to how information is stored in the taxonomies:

Full-entry model
In the full-entry model information is stored redundantly at all relevant levels in the taxonomy, which means that it operates, if at all, with minimal generalization.

Usage-based model
The usage-based model is based on inductive learning, meaning that linguistic knowledge is acquired in a bottom-up manner through use. It allows for redundancy and generalizations, because the language user generalizes over recurring experiences of use.

Default inheritance model
According to the default inheritance model, each network has a default central form-meaning pairing from which all instances inherit their features. It thus operates with a fairly high level of generalization, but does also allow for some redundancy in that it recognizes extensions of different types.

Complete inheritance model
In the complete inheritance model, information is stored only once at the most superordinate level of the network. Instances at all other levels inherit features from the superordinate item. The complete inheritance does not allow for redundancy in the networks.

Principle of no synonymy 
Because construction grammar does not operate with surface derivations from underlying structures, it adheres to functionalist linguist Dwight Bolinger's principle of no synonymy, on which Adele Goldberg elaborates in her book.

This means that construction grammarians argue, for instance, that active and passive versions of the same proposition are not derived from an underlying structure, but are instances of two different constructions. As constructions are pairings of form and meaning, active and passive versions of the same proposition are not synonymous, but display differences in content: in this case the pragmatic content.

Some construction grammars 
As mentioned above, Construction grammar is a "family" of theories rather than one unified theory. There are a number of formalized Construction grammar frameworks. Some of these are:

Berkeley Construction Grammar
Berkeley Construction Grammar (BCG: formerly also called simply Construction Grammar in upper case) focuses on the formal aspects of constructions and makes use of a unification-based framework for description of syntax, not unlike head-driven phrase structure grammar. Its proponents/developers include Charles Fillmore, Paul Kay, Laura Michaelis, and to a certain extent Ivan Sag. Immanent within BCG works like Fillmore and Kay 1995 and Michaelis and Ruppenhofer 2001 is the notion that phrasal representations—embedding relations—should not be used to represent combinatoric properties of lexemes or lexeme classes. For example, BCG abandons the traditional practice of using non-branching domination (NP over N' over N) to describe undetermined nominals that function as NPs, instead introducing a determination construction that requires ('asks for') a non-maximal nominal sister and a lexical 'maximality' feature for which plural and mass nouns are unmarked. BCG also offers a unification-based representation of 'argument structure' patterns as abstract verbal lexeme entries ('linking constructions'). These linking constructions include transitive, oblique goal and passive constructions. These constructions describe classes of verbs that combine with phrasal constructions like the VP construction but contain no phrasal information in themselves.

Sign Based Construction Grammar

In the mid-2000s, several of the developers of BCG, including Charles Fillmore, Paul Kay, Ivan Sag and Laura Michaelis, collaborated in an effort to improve the formal rigor of BCG and clarify its representational conventions. The result was Sign Based Construction Grammar (SBCG). SBCG is based on a multiple-inheritance hierarchy of typed feature structures. The most important type of feature structure in SBCG is the sign, with subtypes word, lexeme and phrase. The inclusion of phrase within the canon of signs marks a major departure from traditional syntactic thinking. In SBCG, phrasal signs are licensed by correspondence to the mother of some licit construct of the grammar. A construct is a local tree with signs at its nodes. Combinatorial constructions define classes of constructs. Lexical class constructions describe combinatoric and other properties common to a group of lexemes. Combinatorial constructions include both inflectional and derivational constructions. SBCG is both formal and generative; while cognitive-functional grammarians have often opposed their standards and practices to those of formal, generative grammarians, there is in fact no incompatibility between a formal, generative approach and a rich, broad-coverage, functionally based grammar. It simply happens that many formal, generative theories are descriptively inadequate grammars. SBCG is generative in a way that prevailing syntax-centered theories are not: its mechanisms are intended to represent all of the patterns of a given language, including idiomatic ones; there is no 'core' grammar in SBCG. SBCG a licensing-based theory, as opposed to one that freely generates syntactic combinations and uses general principles to bar illicit ones: a word, lexeme or phrase is well formed if and only if it is described by a lexeme or construction. Recent SBCG works have expanded on the lexicalist model of idiomatically combining expressions sketched out in Sag 2012.

Goldbergian/Lakovian construction grammar
The type of construction grammar associated with linguists like Goldberg and Lakoff looks mainly at the external relations of constructions and the structure of constructional networks. In terms of form and function, this type of construction grammar puts psychological plausibility as its highest desideratum. It emphasizes experimental results and parallels with general cognitive psychology. It also draws on certain principles of cognitive linguistics. In the Goldbergian strand, constructions interact with each other in a network via four inheritance relations: polysemy link, subpart link, metaphorical extension, and finally instance link.

Cognitive grammar
Sometimes, Ronald Langacker's cognitive grammar framework is described as a type of construction grammar. Cognitive grammar deals mainly with the semantic content of constructions, and its central argument is that conceptual semantics is primary to the degree that form mirrors, or is motivated by, content. Langacker argues that even abstract grammatical units like part-of-speech classes are semantically motivated and involve certain conceptualizations.

Radical construction grammar
William A. Croft's radical construction grammar is designed for typological purposes and takes into account cross-linguistic factors. It deals mainly with the internal structure of constructions. Radical construction grammar is totally non-reductionist, and Croft argues that constructions are not derived from their parts, but that the parts are derived from the constructions they appear in. Thus, in radical construction grammar, constructions are likened to Gestalts. Radical construction grammar rejects the idea that syntactic categories, roles, and relations are universal and argues that they are not only language-specific, but also construction specific. Thus, there are no universals that make reference to formal categories, since formal categories are language- and construction-specific. The only universals are to be found in the patterns concerning the mapping of meaning onto form. Radical construction grammar rejects the notion of syntactic relations altogether and replaces them with semantic relations. Like Goldbergian/Lakovian construction grammar and cognitive grammar, radical construction grammar is closely related to cognitive linguistics, and like cognitive grammar, radical construction grammar appears to be based on the idea that form is semantically motivated.

Embodied construction grammar
Embodied construction grammar (ECG), which is being developed by the Neural Theory of Language (NTL) group at ICSI, UC Berkeley, and the University of Hawaii, particularly including Benjamin Bergen and Nancy Chang, adopts the basic constructionist definition of a grammatical construction, but emphasizes the relation of constructional semantic content to embodiment and sensorimotor experiences. A central claim is that the content of all linguistic signs involves mental simulations and is ultimately dependent on basic image schemas of the kind advocated by Mark Johnson and George Lakoff, and so ECG aligns itself with cognitive linguistics. Like construction grammar, embodied construction grammar makes use of a unification-based model of representation. A non-technical introduction to the NTL theory behind embodied construction grammar as well as the theory itself and a variety of applications can be found in Jerome Feldman's From Molecule to Metaphor: A Neural Theory of Language (MIT Press, 2006).

Fluid construction grammar
Fluid construction grammar (FCG) was designed by Luc Steels and his collaborators for doing experiments on the origins and evolution of language. FCG is a fully operational and computationally implemented formalism for construction grammars and proposes a uniform mechanism for parsing and production. Moreover, it has been demonstrated through robotic experiments that FCG grammars can be grounded in embodiment and sensorimotor experiences. FCG integrates many notions from contemporary computational linguistics such as feature structures and unification-based language processing. Constructions are considered bidirectional and hence usable both for parsing and production. Processing is flexible in the sense that it can even cope with partially ungrammatical or incomplete sentences. FCG is called 'fluid' because it acknowledges the premise that language users constantly change and update their grammars. The research on FCG is conducted at Sony CSL Paris and the AI Lab at the Vrije Universiteit Brussel.

Criticism

Esa Itkonen, who defends humanistic linguistics and opposes Darwinian linguistics, questions the originality of the work of Adele Goldberg, Michael Tomasello, Gilles Fauconnier, William Croft and George Lakoff. According to Itkonen, construction grammarians have appropriated old ideas in linguistics adding some false claims. For example, construction type and conceptual blending correspond to analogy and blend, respectively, in the works of William Dwight Whitney, Leonard Bloomfield, Charles Hockett, and others.

At the same time, the claim made by construction grammarians, that their research represents a continuation of Saussurean linguistics, has been considered misleading. German philologist Elisabeth Leiss regards construction grammar as regress, linking it with the 19th century social darwinism of August Schleicher. There is a dispute between the advocates of construction grammar and memetics, an evolutionary approach which adheres to the Darwinian view of language and culture. Advocates of construction grammar argue that memetics takes the perspective of intelligent design to cultural evolution while construction grammar rejects human free will in language construction; but, according to memetician Susan Blackmore, this makes construction grammar the same as memetics.

Lastly, the most basic syntactic patterns of English, namely the core grammatical relations subject-verb, verb object and verb-indirect object, are counter-evidence for the very concept of constructions as pairings of linguistic patterns with meanings. Instead of the postulated form-meaning pairing, core grammatical relations possess a wide variability of semantics, exhibiting a neutralization of semantic distinctions. For instance, in a detailed discussion of the dissociation of grammatical case-roles from semantics, Talmy Givon lists the multiple semantic roles of subjects and direct objects in English. As these phenomena are well-established, some linguists propose that core grammatical relations be excluded from CxG as they are not constructions, leaving the theory to be a model merely of idioms or infrequently used, minor patterns.  

As the pairing of the syntactic construction and its prototypical meaning are learned in early childhood, children should initially learn the basic constructions with their  prototypical semantics, that is, 'agent of action' for the subject in the SV relation, 'effected object of agent's action' for the direct object term in VO, and 'recipient in transfer of possession of object' for the indirect-object in VI. Anat Ninio examined the speech of a large sample of young English-speaking children and found that they do not in fact learn the syntactic patterns with the prototypical semantics claimed to be associated with them, or with any single semantics.  The major reason is that such pairings are not consistently modelled for them in parental speech. Examining the maternal speech addressed to the children, Ninio also found that the pattern of subjects, direct objects and indirect objects in mothers’ speech does not provide the required prototypical semantics for the construction to be established.  Adele Goldberg and her associates had previously reported similar negative results concerning the pattern of direct objects in parental speech.   These findings are a blow to the CxG theory that relies on a learned association of form and prototypical meaning in order to set up the constructions said to form the basic units of syntax.

See also
Anankastic conditional
Construction Morphology
Snowclone

References

Further reading
Bergen, Benjamin and Nancy Chang. Embodied Construction Grammar in Simulation-Based Language Understanding. In press. J.-O. Östman and M. Fried (eds.). Construction Grammar(s): Cognitive and Cross-Language Dimensions. Johns Benjamins.
Croft, William A. (2001). Radical Construction Grammar: Syntactic Theory in Typological Perspective. Oxford: Oxford University Press.
Croft, William A. and D. Alan Cruse (2004). Cognitive Linguistics. Cambridge: Cambridge University Press.
Feldman, Jerome A. (2006). From Molecule to Metaphor: A Neural Theory of Language . Cambridge : MIT Press.
Fillmore, Charles, Paul Kay and Catherine O'Connor (1988). Regularity and Idiomaticity in Grammatical Constructions: The Case of let alone. Language 64: 501–38.
Goldberg, Adele. (1995) Constructions: A Construction Grammar Approach to Argument Structure. Chicago: University of Chicago Press.
Goldberg, Adele (2006). Constructions at Work: The Nature of Generalization in Language. Oxford: Oxford University Press.
Hilpert, Martin (2014). Construction Grammar and its Application to English. Edinburgh: Edinburgh University Press.
Lakoff, George (1987). Women, Fire, and Dangerous Things: What Categories Reveal about the Mind. Chicago: CSLI.
Langacker, Ronald (1987, 1991). Foundations of Cognitive Grammar. 2 vols. Stanford: Stanford University Press.
Michaelis, Laura A. and Knud Lambrecht (1996). Toward a Construction-Based Model of Language Function: The Case of Nominal Extraposition. Language 72: 215–247. 
Michaelis, Laura A. and Josef Ruppenhofer (2001). Beyond Alternations: A Construction-Based Account of the Applicative Construction in German. Stanford: CSLI Publications.
Michaelis, Laura A. (2004). Type Shifting in Construction Grammar: An Integrated Approach to Aspectual Coercion. Cognitive Linguistics 15: 1–67.
De Beule Joachim and Steels Luc (2005). Hierarchy in Fluid Construction Grammar. Lecture Notes in Artificial Intelligence (LNCS/LNAI) 3698 (2005) pages 1–15). Berlin: Springer.
Steels, Luc and De Beule, Joachim (2006). Unify and merge in fluid construction grammars. In: Vogt, P., Sugita, Y., Tuci, E. and Nehaniv, C., editors, Symbol Grounding and Beyond: Proceedings of the Third International Workshop on the Emergence and Evolution of Linguistic Communication, EELC 2006, Rome, Italy, September 30–October 1, 2006, Lecture Notes in Computer Science (LNCS/LNAI) Vol. 4211, Berlin. Springer-Verlag. pp. 197–223.

External links
Construction Grammar
Fluid Construction Grammar
VUB Artificial Intelligence Laboratory
Sony CSL Paris
NTL Project

Memetics
Cognitive linguistics
Sociobiology
Grammar frameworks